James Giermanski is a specialist in supply chain security and container shipping programs of the U.S. Department of Homeland Security.  He is a former U.S. Air Force Office of Special Investigations (Col. ret.) and a former FBI agent.

Biography
Giermanski is an expert focused on security operations in the global supply chain, who is concerned with respective contributions of governmental and nongovernmental stakeholders to this worldwide concern. Global Supply Chain Security explores the potential impact of port-related catastrophic events in the United States and their effects worldwide, concentrating, in particular, on the United States' contribution to global container security.

A former military officer, and FBI agent, Giermanski is a frequent commentator on container security issues and weapons defense matters, particularly such as concerns border and customs work on supply chain security.
Giermanski taught at Texas A&M University, serving as Regents Professor and as an adjunct graduate faculty member at the University of North Carolina at Charlotte.  He was Director of Transportation and Logistics Studies, Center for the Study of Western Hemispheric Trade at Texas A&M International University.

Giermanski serves a visiting scholar at the Air Force Doctrine Development and Education Center, an Air Force think tank at Maxwell Air Force Base.

Education 
 Master, University of North Carolina
 Master, Florida International University
 Doctorate, University of Miami
 Graduate, U.S. Air Command and Staff College

See also
 Automated Targeting System
 U.S. Customs and Border Protection
 Global Trade Exchange
 Denise Krepp

References

External links
 BOOK: Global Supply Chain Security – James Giermanski
 BOOK: Training of Special Agent IMAs Assigned to the Air Force Office of Special Investigations: An Empirical Analysis, Research report (Air University (U.S.))). James R. Giermanski, 1986
 BOOK: NAFTA rules of origin: an explanation, James R. Giermanski, Cathy Sauceda, Institute for International Trade, Graduate School of International Trade & Business Administration, Texas A&M International University, 1994
 BOOK: Labor mobility under NAFTA: its border impact, Jane LeMaster, James R. Giermanski, Texas A & M International University. Institute for International Trade, 1994
 BOOK: NAFTA and the process of approval, James R. Giermanski, Henry Cuellar. Texas Center for Border Economic and Enterprise Development, Graduate School of International Trade and Business Administration, Laredo State University, 1992
 BOOK: The impact of NAFTA on U.S.-Mexico commercial and border zones and the potential consequences to the border, James R. Giermanski, Texas A & M International University. Institute for International Trade, 1994

United States Air Force civilians
Federal Bureau of Investigation agents
Living people
Year of birth missing (living people)